Pieter Maertensz Coy, also Pieter Martensz Coij or Pedr Marteen (died 1629), was a 17th-century diplomat of the Netherlands, active in Morocco and Algiers.

When young, Pieter Maertensz Coy was captured by the Turks and imprisoned as a slave in Algiers. It was there that he learned to speak Turkish.

Eventually – unbeknownst whether set free or escaped from captivity – he managed to return to the Netherlands, where he then resided in Hoorn.

In April–May 1605, Pieter Maertensz Coy went from the Low Countries to Safi in Morocco and Algiers accompanied by 135 Muslim captives, both Turkish and Moorish, who had been seized by the Dutch in the Low Countries in a naval encounter with Spanish galleys. This event led to a first Dutch mission to Morocco led by Pieter Maertensz Coy.

From 1605, Coy became representative of the States General in Marrakesh.

In 1607 however, he was imprisoned by the Moroccan Sultan Mulay Zidan, following an incident in which Dutch pirates attacked English shipping. He was released on July 18, 1607, with the help of a local secretary to the Sultan, Al-Hajari.

Pieter Maertensz Coy was recalled to the Netherlands on December 13, 1607.

He met the Moroccan envoy to the Netherlands Al-Hajari in La Hague in 1613, as recounted by the latter in his 1641 book The Book of the Protector of Religion against the Unbelievers.

Pieter Maertensz Coy arranged the encounter of Al-Hajari with Maurice of Nassau in 1613.

Coy was again nominated Dutch Consul in Algiers from 1626, where he succeeded Keyser, until his death in 1629.  He died in Algiers.

See also
Morocco-Netherlands relations

Notes

Year of birth unknown
1629 deaths
17th-century Dutch diplomats
People from Hoorn